Julius Davidovich Brutzkus or Judah Loeb Brutzkus or Joselis Bruckus (Yehuda Loeb ben David Brutzkus; ; 1870, Palanga, Courland Governorate – January 27, 1951, Tel Aviv) was a Lithuanian Jewish historian, scholar, and politician, and one of the leaders of Zionist movement in Russian Empire.

He was born in 1870 in Palanga, Courland Governorate, Russian Empire (in present-day Lithuania). His brother was the economist Boris Brutzkus. Julius studied in Moscow at the gymnasium and the University of Moscow. His family, along with thousands of other Jewish families, was expelled from the city in 1892  (see May Laws). He was able to continue his education and received his doctorate in 1894. Brutzkus took part in the Russian Jewish bibliographical work, "" (Systematic Index of Literature concerning Jews, "Sistematicheskiy Ukazatel Literatury o Yevreyakh"). Beginning in 1895, Brutzkus contributed to the Russian-Jewish periodical Voskhod. In 1899 he was appointed assistant editor of that periodical.

In 1907 he became one of the Editors of the journal "Sunrise" (Rassvet),
together with Zeev Jabotinsky. 

In 1917 he was elected to Russian Constituent Assembly on the Jewish list representing Minsk Governorate.

On April 23 1920 he was arrested in Moscow by Cheka (OGPU- KGB name at a time) together with 106 delegates of the Russian Zionist Conference.  
 
In 1923 he served as Minister for Jewish Affairs in the Lithuanian government and was elected to the Lithuanian Parliament in November of that year.

Since early 1900th was one of the leaders of the World Jewish Health Society, the OSE. In 1924 Julius Brutzkus moved to Berlin, and in 1934 to Paris, where he led the OSE. 

He tirelessly devoted himself to the effort of saving European Jews. A former minister in the Lithuania government, he convinced the Consul of Lithuania in Marseille to issue citizenship papers for Jews detained in camps in France. Brutzkus utilized his status to access the camps and distributed hundreds of documents, also to non-Lithuanian nationals, before he was arrested in 1940 and sentenced to six months in prison by Vishy regime in France. He escaped to USA where he became a leader of the Union of Russian Zionists. 

In 1949 moved to Israel to Petah Tikva, where he died on January 29 1951.
In 2022 B'nai Brith awarded Julius Brutzkus with a Certificate of the Jewish Savior of the Holocaust (posthumously). 
 
Throughout the late nineteenth and early twentieth centuries Brutzkus authored a vast array of articles and books in Russian, Lithuanian, Polish, English, German, Yiddish, Hebrew, and French on the history of the Jews in Russia; he was particularly intrigued with the history of the Khazars and the early Rus' Khaganate. He also wrote numerous works on the economic and political history of Eastern Europe and the cultural history of Mizrahi Jewry.

Brutzkus was an ardent Zionist and encouraged Jews to engage in political action and self-defense.

Selected works
 B. D. Bruckus: »Ėkonomičeskija osnovy sovremennago političeskago krizisa Rossii« [i. e. Die ökonomischen Ursachen der gegenwärtigen politischen Krise Rußlands]. Russkij naučnyj institut RNI, Berlin, January 27, 1928 (i.e. Russian scientific institute)
 "Pershi zvistki pro Evreev n Polshchi ta na Rusi". Nankovyi Zbirnyk. 24 (1927), pp. 3–11
 "Bukhara." Encyclopaedia Judaica,  vol. 4. Berlin 1929. p. 1126.
 Der Handel der westeuropäischen Juden mit dem alten Kiev, in "Zeitschrift für die Geschichte der Juden in Deutschland", No. 2-3, Berlin 1931, pp. 97–110 in German
 "Di Geshikhte fun di Bergyiden oyf kavkaz." (History of the Jewish Mountaineers in Dagestan, Caucasia), YIVO Studies in History, vol.2. Vilna, 1937 (in Yiddish)
 "The Khazar Origin of Ancient Kiev". Slavonic and East European Review, 22, 1944, pp. 108–124

References

External links 
 Posthumous Citation Award to Julius Brutzkus as a Jewish Holocaust  Resquer
 Jewish Telegraph Agency Announcement of the death of Julius Brutzkus, January 29 1951.
 BRUTZKUS, JUDAH LOEB BEN DAVID in the Jewish Encyclopedia
 Dr. Julius Yehuda Brutzkus public profile, with a comment of his grandson (a correction). In English
 Joselis Bruckus (1870–1951). In Lithuanian language.

1870 births
1951 deaths
People from Palanga
People from Courland Governorate
Jews from the Russian Empire
Imperial Moscow University alumni
Lithuanian Jews
Minister for Jewish Affairs of Lithuania
Jewish historians
Jewish orientalists
Khazar studies
Lithuanian Zionists
Orientalists from the Russian Empire
Russian Constituent Assembly members
Members of the Seimas